José Luis Miñano García (born 22 May 1987) is a Spanish footballer who plays for Gandía as a midfielder.

Career
Born in Alicante, Miñano began playing football in the youth system of Alicante CF. At age 21, he made his senior debut with the club and would make four Segunda División appearances before leaving for Hércules CF.

Miñano spent eight seasons in the Segunda División B with Hércules and Real Murcia.

References

External links

1987 births
Living people
Footballers from Alicante
Spanish footballers
Association football midfielders
Segunda División players
Segunda División B players
Tercera División players
Alicante CF footballers
Valencia CF Mestalla footballers
Huracán Valencia CF players
Elche CF Ilicitano footballers
Hércules CF players
Real Murcia players
CF La Nucía players
Belarusian Premier League players
FC Torpedo-BelAZ Zhodino players
CF Gandía players
Spanish expatriate footballers
Expatriate footballers in Belarus
Spanish expatriate sportspeople in Belarus